London Lituanica was a British basketball team who competed in the English Basketball League.

History
The team was created in 2010 by Lithuanian immigrants in London and started playing the Britain Lithuanians Basketball League.

In 2012, Lituanica joined the English Basketball League Division 3 finishing as runner-up of the league after losing to Plymouth Marjon in the finals. The club had the goal to be the strongest Lithuanian team in the UK and hopes joining the British Basketball League in the next years.

In 2015 Lituanica achieved promotion to the top division of the EBL after being crowned as champion of the Division 2.

On 14 September 2017, just one season after their debut in the Division 1, the club announced its withdrawal from competition.

Season to season

See also
London BC Medelynas

References

External links
London Lituanica website
Profile at Eurobasket.com

Basketball teams established in 2010
Basketball teams in England
Basketball teams in London
Sport in the London Borough of Newham
Basketball teams disestablished in 2017